Chvojenec is a municipality and village in Pardubice District in the Pardubice Region of the Czech Republic. It has about 700 inhabitants.

History
The first written mention of Chvojenec is from 1336, when it was a part of Chvojno estate. A small fortress stood here until the 16th century. Chvojenec was known for the production of pitch.

During the 18th century Chvojenec, together with Rokytno and Býšť, was the centre of a persecuted religious sect of Deists called blouznivci.

Transport
Chvojenec is spread around the road from Hradec Králové to Brno.

References

External links

 

Villages in Pardubice District